End Game is a 2018 American short documentary film by Rob Epstein and Jeffrey Friedman about terminally ill patients in a San Francisco hospital meeting medical practitioners seeking to change the perception around life and death. The film was executive produced by Steven Ungerleider and Shoshana R. Ungerleider. It was released by Netflix.

Synopsis 
The documentary begins with Dr. Pantilat, the palliative care doctor at the University of California, San Francisco, visiting terminally ill patients to speak with them about palliative care. The first patient he speaks about this with is Kym Anderson and her husband. Dr. Pantilat begins to describe palliative care as helping people live as well as possible for as long as possible; a care that focuses on not only the disease but the whole person, where there are people to help the patient with their symptoms, ensure the patient has the information they need to make complex decisions about their health, and have an extra layer of support for themselves and their family. Despite Dr. Pantilat’s attempt to bring light to palliative care, Kym and her husband do not side with palliative care as an option for Kym’s remaining time. The label the couple has associated with palliative care is “kissing it goodbye.”

The documentary then proceeds to the Zen Caregiving Project, where there has been the acquisition of a new patient named Bruce. Bruce is 66 years old and has made the choice to stop dialysis. Dr. BJ Miller, a palliative care physician, and his colleagues welcome Bruce into the home.

Within the Zen Caregiving Project is another patient named Pat Harris. Pat has been diagnosed with fibroids and uterus cancer. Despite the circumstances, Pat mentions she is doing well, as she has people in the Zen Caregiving Project who help her watch the symptoms she experiences and understand what is right or wrong with it, people that give her medicine and monitor it, so she does not have to do it alone. Pat then goes onto describe a possible treatment to prolong her life in chemotherapy. To assist Pat with her decision, registered nurses from the palliative care team help Pat weigh out her options. Ultimately, Pat decides to accept the chemotherapy treatment in an attempt to prolong her life.

Dr. Pantilat and his colleagues then meet with Mitra, a 45-year-old woman battling cancer, and her family. Dr. Pantilat and his team ask Mitra’s family whether or not they would prefer to provide treatment for Mitra or keep her at home and provide care from there. The decision of prolonging Mitra’s life is split between her mother, Vija, and her husband, Hamid. Dr. Pantilat and his team continue to talk through the situation with Mitra’s family to help answer their questions and ultimately choose what they feel is right. As part of the information being provided by Dr. Pantilat and his team, Dr. Bivona proposes the idea that Mitra becomes part of a research program where doctors try to understand what happened to the cancer via autopsy.

As the documentary progresses, Dr. Pantilat had his role as the palliative care doctor taken over by Giovanni Elia. Dr. Elia meets with Mitra and her family, where Mitra admits she is no longer doing well. Dr. Elia and his supporting cast then begin to speak with Mitra’s family about Mitra’s state; the doctors admit that Mitra is looking better from a short-term perspective, but she has a limited time to live. Dr. Elia asks Mitra’s family where she would like to be during these final moments of her life, where he mentions that inpatient hospice is a choice for Mitra. Mitra’s mother disagrees with the idea of inpatient hospice, as she would like to be with Mitra until her last breath; however, Mitra’s family is torn with the decision. As Mitra’s condition worsens, Azita, Mitra’s sister, explains to her mother that caring for Mitra at home would not serve as a just option for Mitra nor for Vaji.

Dr. Miller eventually meets with Thekla, who is experiencing shortness of breath, at the University of California, San Francisco, Symptom Management Service. Dr Miller does not necessarily dive into what Thekla’s shortness of breath may lead to, but rather he encourages Thekla to form a relationship with death, so that death is known and not as frightening. Dr. Miller attempts to change Thekla’s perspective on death, as he mentions that one cannot know what it is exactly like to be dead, so all that can be done is getting acclimated with the mystery that is called death.

As the documentary comes to a close, Dr. Miller explains that there is nothing medical about death, but it is something that is purely human and a time to celebrate and rejoice the deceased's life.

Cast
 Mitra: A 45 year old woman battling a devastating cancer.
 BJ Miller: A disabled speaker and physician practicing palliative care.
 Pat: A patient suffering from fibroids and uterus cancer.
 Kym: A patient suffering from an undisclosed disease.
 Thekla: A patient experiencing disease with shortness of breath as a symptom.
 Bruce: A patient who has discontinued his use of dialysis.
 Dr. Pantilat: The doctor on the palliative care team at the University of California, San Francisco.
 Hamid: Mitra's husband.
 Vaji: Mitra's mom.
 Trever Bivona: Another doctor a part of the palliative care team.
 Giovanni Elia: The palliative care doctor taking over the role of Dr. Pantilat.
 Azita: Mitra's sister.

Reception

Critical response

Peter Debruge of Variety wrote: "Miller's insights have been so useful as to have been featured by Oprah Winfrey, and one needn't be hospitalized or faced with losing relatives to benefit from his unique perspective."

Accolades
End Game was nominated for the Academy Award for Best Documentary (Short Subject) at the 91st Academy Awards. It was also nominated for the Short Film Grand Jury Prize at the Sundance Film Festival.

References

External links
 
 
 
 Zen Caregiving Project

Netflix original documentary films
2018 short films
Films about death
Films directed by Rob Epstein
Films directed by Jeffrey Friedman
Films set in San Francisco
American documentary films
Documentary films about health care
Healthcare in San Francisco
2010s English-language films
2010s American films